
Jach'a Quta (Aymara jach'a big, great, quta lake, "great lake", hispanicized spelling Jacha Kkota) is a lake in Bolivia located in the La Paz Department, Aroma Province, Calamarca Municipality, west of Calamarca.

See also 
 Urqu Jawira

References 

Lakes of La Paz Department (Bolivia)